Mar Thoma Sleeha Cathedral is a Syro-Malabar Catholic cathedral located in Bellwood, Illinois, United States.  It is the seat for the St. Thomas Syro-Malabar Catholic Eparchy of Chicago. The church was dedicated on July 5, 2008, by Cardinal Mar Varkey Vithaythil.  The grotto on the cathedral grounds was dedicated by Major Archbishop George Alencherry in October 2011.

See also
List of Catholic cathedrals in the United States
List of cathedrals in the United States

References

External links

 Official Cathedral Site

Roman Catholic churches completed in 2008
Indian-American culture in Illinois
Churches in Cook County, Illinois
Eastern Catholic cathedrals in Illinois
21st-century Roman Catholic church buildings in the United States
Syro-Malabar Catholic cathedrals
2008 establishments in Illinois
Buildings and structures in Cook County, Illinois
Indian-American culture